Jean-Philippe Karlen (born 26 September 1972 in Switzerland) is a Swiss retired footballer.

References

Swiss men's footballers
Living people
Association football forwards
Association football midfielders
Association football defenders
1972 births
FC Lausanne-Sport players
Yverdon-Sport FC players
SC Kriens players
Servette FC players
SR Delémont players